State Route 83 (SR-83) is a  state highway in eastern Box Elder County, Utah, United States, that connects the towns of Corinne and Howell and provides access to Golden Spike National Historic Site from the east, as well as Thiokol's facility.

Route description

The route starts in the western part of Corinne at SR-13, at the intersection of 4800 West and Promontory Road. The route passes Utah State Route 102, which provides access to Tremonton via Penrose, Thatcher, and Bothwell. After this junction, the route starts to turn northward, passing Lampo Junction, a local access road to Golden Spike National Historical Park), and the Thiokol rocket plant and test range. From this point, the route continues north, save for a  jog to the east, passing through Howell and terminating at the Howell interchange of Interstate 84.

History
The road from Corinne to Park Valley Junction was commissioned as SR-83 in 1935. In 1955, the portion west of Promontory Junction was decommissioned, and was replaced by the road from Promontory Junction to the Golden Spike National Historic Park.

In 1962, the portion west of Lampo Junctionwas transferred back to local jurisdiction, and the route was extended north from Lampo Junction to the Howell interchange of the former Utah State Route 5 (modern day Interstate 84).

The portion of SR-83 between the old and new intersections was transferred to SR-13, putting the western terminus of SR-83 at the new intersection.

Major intersections

See also

 List of state highways in Utah
 List of named highway junctions in Utah

References

External links

 Highway Referencing:  Route 83 (PDF)
 Highway Resolutions: Route 83 (PDF)
 Route 151 on Dan Stober's Utah Highways (as archived by the Wayback Machine)

 083
083